Minister of Social Communication of Angola is a cabinet level position in the national government. The position was established in 1975 with João Filipe Martins.

Name changes
 1975–1992: Minister of Information
 1992–present: Minister of Social Communication

Ministers of Social Communication
 1975–1976: João Filipe Martins
 1990–1991: Boaventura da Silva Cardoso
 1991–1992: Rui Óscar de Carvalho
 1993–2005: Pedro Hendrick Vaal Neto
 2005–2010: Manuel António Rabelais
 2010–2012: Carolina Cerqueira
 2012–2017: José Luís de Matos
 2017–2019: Anibal João da Silva Melo
 2019–present: Nuno dos Anjos Caldas Albino

References

External links

 http://www.mcs.gov.ao/

Social Communication
Social Communication Ministers
Politics of Angola